Heckler v. Chaney, 470 U.S. 821 (1985), was a United States Supreme Court decision that held agency decisions to not undertake enforcement proceedings is "committed to agency discretion by law" and therefore not subject to judicial review under the Administrative Procedure Act.

Background 
Respondents had been convicted in Oklahoma and Texas criminal courts and sentenced to death. The procedure to be used was lethal injection. They applied first to the FDA, stating that while the drugs to be involved in the lethal injection had been approved, the manner in which they were going to be used had not, in violation of the Food, Drug, and Cosmetic Act's prohibition against "misbranding". They also argued that the Act's procedures for "new drugs" should be applicable, given that these drugs were being utilized for a new and un-tested purpose. More simply, they were arguing that the FDA had not certified that the drugs were "safe and effective" for human executions, and thus should be barred for being distributed via interstate commerce.

Opinion of the Court 
Justice Rehnquist delivered the opinion of the Court saying, "[The Court] granted certiorari to review the implausible result that the FDA is required to exercise its enforcement power to ensure that states only use drugs that are 'safe and effective' for human execution..."
The Court assessed that the Court of Appeals decision coming before raised three questions:

 whether the FDA had jurisdiction to undertake the enforcement actions requested
 whether, if it did have jurisdiction, its refusal to take those actions was subject to judicial review, and
 whether, if reviewable, its refusal was arbitrary, capricious, or an abuse of discretion.

The Court's opinion skirted the jurisdictional issue, ruling that an agency's decision not to pursue an enforcement action is presumptively unreviewable, as such actions are "committed to agency discretion by law" under § 701(a)(2) of the Administrative Procedure Act.  

The Court however, did not reach this conclusion based on a reading of text, but rather on the notion that such decisions were presumptively unreviewable under the common law, that it was Congress' intention under the APA to codify the common law, and that therefore such a presumption should be sustained under the APA.

The Court further supported its holding by pointing to three reasons why reviewing an agency's decision not to act is unsuitable to judicial review. First, agency decisions whether to initiate enforcement actions are usually based on a complicated balancing of multiple factors, such as efficient allocation of limited resources, likelihood of success, and the relationship of the potential action to the overall enforcement strategy of the agency. The courts are ill-suited to perform such an analysis. Secondly, the court noted when an agency chooses not to act, they are not exercising any coercive power over others that might be worthy of heightened judicial protection. Third, the Court found an agency’s discretion not to seek enforcement as being analogous to exercises of prosecutorial discretion that courts have traditionally been unwilling to review.

The Court though emphasized that the presumption of unreviewability is rebuttable where (1) an agency declines to act based "solely" on its belief that it lacks jurisdiction, or (2) where an agency "consciously and expressly" adopts a policy that is so extreme that it represents an abdication of its statutory responsibilities.

The Court declined to address whether the presumption of unreviewability applies to an agency decision not to issue a rule or initiate a rulemaking.

External links
 

United States Supreme Court cases
United States administrative case law
1985 in United States case law
United States Supreme Court cases of the Burger Court